Albert Edward Peatfield (13 April 1874 – 12 December 1953) was an English first-class cricketer.

Peatfield was educated at Huntingdon Grammar School and was an alumnus of the Victoria University. After graduating, he went into teaching and was an assistant master at a high school in Blackpool. Prior to his appointment as an assistant master in Blackpool, Peatfield worked in Wales, where he played minor counties cricket for Glamorgan, making three appearances in the 1903 Minor Counties Championship. Having moved to Blackpool, Peatfield played a single first-class cricket match for an England XI against the touring West Indians at Blackpool in 1906. Batting twice in the match, he ended the England XI first-innings not out on 2, while in their second-innings he was dismissed for 16 runs by Sydney Smith. He died at Retford, the town of his birth, in December 1953.

References

External links

1874 births
1953 deaths
Schoolteachers from Nottinghamshire
English cricketers
Glamorgan cricketers
Non-international England cricketers
Sportspeople from Retford
Cricketers from Nottinghamshire